The IPSC European Rifle Championship is an IPSC level 4 championship hosted every third year in Europe.

History 
 2009 Hengsvann, Kongsberg, Norway
 2012 Beliakovec, Veliko Tarnovo, Bulgaria
 2015 Felsőtárkány, Bükk, Hungary
 2018 Karlskoga, Sweden - Cancelled due to the 2018 Sweden wildfires

Champions 
The following is a list of current and past European IPSC Rifle champions.

Overall category

Lady category

Junior category

Senior category

Super senior category

See also 
 IPSC Nordic Rifle Championship
 IPSC European Handgun Championship
 IPSC European Shotgun Championship

References 

Match Results - 2009 IPSC European Rifle Championship
Match Results - 2012 IPSC European Rifle Championship
Match Results - 2015 IPSC European Rifle Championship

IPSC shooting competitions
European championships
Shooting sports in Europe by country